Jack Leonard Rocker (August 12, 1922 – November 27, 2010) was an American professional basketball player for the Philadelphia Warriors of the Basketball Association of America (BAA).  He played college basketball for the California Golden Bears and was an All-Pacific Coast Conference (PCC) selection in 1947. Rocker then played one season for the Warriors in 1947–48.

BAA career statistics

Regular season

References

External links

1922 births
2010 deaths
Amateur Athletic Union men's basketball players
American men's basketball players
Basketball players from California
California Golden Bears men's basketball players
Centers (basketball)
Forwards (basketball)
Minneapolis Lakers players
People from Lindsay, California
Philadelphia Warriors players